The Lagonda 16/65 was a car introduced by Lagonda in 1926. Production continued until 1930.

Around 250 cars were made. Only one surviving car is known to the Lagonda club.

Engine and transmission
The engine was a new design for the car by Arthur Davidson who had been with Lea-Francis. The 6-cylinder, overhead-valve engine had a capacity of 2389 cc at first but this was soon increased to 2692 cc. Both sizes had a stroke of 120mm and the smaller version a bore of 65mm increasing to 69mm for the larger one. A single Zenith carburettor was fitted.

The four-speed gearbox was driven through a single dry-plate clutch and short shaft to where it was located centrally in the car. From the gearbox an open shaft then went to the spiral-bevel rear axle.

Chassis and suspension

The chassis was a lengthened version of that used in the 14/60. Semi-elliptical leaf springs were fitted front and rear. Wire-spoked wheels were used.

Coachwork

Four-door saloon and tourer bodies were made by Lagonda with many of the saloons having fabric bodies. Some chassis went to external coachbuilders.

Versatility

There is a record of one Lagonda 16/65 being used as a substitute for a tractor to sweep hay.

References

16 65
Cars introduced in 1926